Kandt's waxbill (Estrilda kandti) is a species of estrildid finch found in central Africa. It is sometimes considered conspecific with the black-headed waxbill.

References

Clements, J. F., T. S. Schulenberg, M. J. Iliff, B.L. Sullivan, C. L. Wood, and D. Roberson. 2012. The eBird/Clements checklist of birds of the world: Version 6.7. Downloaded from 

Kandt's waxbill
Birds of Central Africa
Kandt's waxbill